The women's foil was one of seven fencing events on the Fencing at the 1924 Summer Olympics programme. It was the first time an Olympic fencing competition was held for women.

The competition was held from Tuesday July 2, 1924, to Thursday July 4, 1924. 25 fencers from 9 nations competed.

Results

Quarterfinals

The top three fencers in each pool advanced. Bouts were to five touches. Times touched was the first tie-breaker if fencers had equal records for their bouts.

Pool A

Pool B

Pool C

Pool D

Semifinals

The top three fencers in each pool advanced. Bouts were to five touches. Times touched was the first tie-breaker if fencers had equal records for their bouts.

Pool A

Pool B

Final

Bouts were to five touches.

References
 
 

Foil women
Olym
Women's events at the 1924 Summer Olympics